Anapela Polataivao is a New Zealand actor, writer, and director of stage and screen.

Background 
Polataivao was born in Samoa and has heritage from Vailoa, Vaiusu, Fagae'e and Safune. She grew up in South Auckland.

Career 
Polataivao began acting as a child with her role at the age of eight. She was part of the Maidment Youth Theatre at the University of Auckland and in 2000 graduated from the New Zealand drama school Toi Whakaari with a Bachelor of Performing Arts (Acting).

In 2002 she formed the theatre group Kila Kokonut Krew with Vela Manusaute. Together they created the musical The Factory which became a web series in 2014. The show toured throughout Australia and had a five-week run at the 2014 Edinburgh Fringe Festival.

With Goretti Chadwick Polataivao created the comedy duo Pani and Pani. They also created and present the Māori Television show, Games of Bros.

Polataivao worked as acting tutor at PIPA (Pacific Institute of Performing Arts) until PIPA closed at the end of 2017 when the BEST Pacific Institute of Education went into liquidation.

A theatre play directed by Polataivao, Wild Dogs Under My Skirt by Tusiata Avia was re-worked in 2016 from a solo to an ensemble cast creating an award-winning production that went on to be presented at the New Zealand Festival in 2018, a national New Zealand tour in 2019 and at the SoHo Playhouse in New York off-Broadway in January 2020.

Filmography

Theatre 
 Frangipani Perfume by Makerita Urale, director Rachel House – actor 
 My Name is Gary Cooper by Victor Rodger -–actor
 Club Paradiso by Victor Rodger – actor
 Where We Once Belonged by Sia Figel – actor
 Wild Dogs Under My Skirt by Tusiata Avia – director
Taro King by Vela Manusaute (2012) – producer (as part of the Kila Kokonut Krew's 10th anniversary celebrations)
 Girl on a Corner by Victor Rodger (2015) – director
 Uma Lava by Victor Rodger (2017) – actor

Awards 
In the 2006 Air New Zealand Screen Awards she was nominated for Best Supporting Actress for her role in The Market.

For her role in Night Shift Polataivao won Best Actress at the 2013 24fps International Short Film Festival in Texas and the StarNow Best Actor award at the 2012 Show Me Shorts Film Festival.

With Vela Manusaute, she received the New Generation Award for theatre at the 2014 Arts Foundation Awards.

Theatre directing awards include Best Director at the Auckland Theatre Awards in 2016 for the Wild Dogs Under My Skirt by Tusiata Avia. Auckland Fringe Festival Best Director award (2015) for Girl on a Corner by Victor Rodger.

In 2019 she won the Contemporary Pacific Art Award at the Arts Pasifika Awards.

References 

Living people
Actresses of Samoan descent
Samoan emigrants to New Zealand
People from the Auckland Region
New Zealand actresses
New Zealand women film directors
New Zealand women comedians
Year of birth missing (living people)
Toi Whakaari alumni